Old Costa Rican Sign Language is a deaf-community sign language of San Jose, spoken by people born before about 1945. Along with American Sign Language, it is one of the sources of New Costa Rican Sign Language. (Woodward 1991, 1992)

References

 James Woodward, 1991, "Sign Language Varieties in Costa Rica", in Sign Language Studies 73, p.329-346

Sign language isolates
Sign languages of Costa Rica